Zhu De (also Chu Teh; 1 December 1886 – 6 July 1976) was a Chinese general, military strategist, politician and revolutionary in the Chinese Communist Party. Born into poverty in 1886 in Sichuan, he was adopted by a wealthy uncle at age nine. His uncle provided him with a superior early education that led to his admission into a military academy. After graduating, he joined a rebel army and became a warlord. It was after this period that he adopted communism. Joining the Chinese Communist Party, he ascended through the ranks of the Chinese Red Army as it closed in on securing the nation in the Chinese Civil War. By the time China was under Mao's control, Zhu was a high-ranking official within the party. He served as commander-in-chief of the Eighth Route Army during the Second Sino-Japanese War and commander-in-chief of the Eighth Route Army during the Chinese Communist Revolution, and the People's Liberation Army after liberation. In 1955, he ranked first among the ten founding marshals of the People's Republic of China, of which he is regarded as one of the principal founders. Zhu remained a prominent political figure until his death in 1976. As the chairman of the Standing Committee of the National People's Congress from 1975 to 1976, Zhu was the head of state of the People's Republic of China.

Biography

Early life 
Zhu was born on 1 December 1886, to a poor tenant farmer's family in Hung, a town in Yilong County, Nanchong, a hilly and isolated part of northern Sichuan province. Of the 15 children born to the family only eight survived. His family relocated to Sichuan during the migration from Hunan province and Guangdong province. His origins are often given as Hakka, but Agnes Smedley's biography of him says his people came from Guangdong and speaks of Hakka as merely associates of his. She also says that older generations of his family had spoken the "Kwangtung dialect" (which would be close to but probably different from modern Cantonese) and that his generation also spoke Sichuanese, a distinct regional variant of Southwest Mandarin that is unintelligible to other speakers of Standard Chinese (Mandarin).

Despite his family's poverty, by pooling resources Zhu was chosen to be sent to a regional private school in 1892. At age nine he was adopted by his prosperous uncle, whose political influence allowed him to gain access to Yunnan Military Academy. He enrolled in a Sichuan high school around 1907 and graduated in 1908. Subsequently, he returned to Yilong's primary school as a gym instructor. An advocate of modern science and political teaching rather than the strict classical education afforded by schools, he was dismissed from his post and entered the Yunnan Military Academy in Kunming. There he joined the Beiyang Army and the Tongmenghui secret political society (the forerunner of the Kuomintang).

Nationalism and warlordism 

At the Yunnan Military Academy in Kunming, he first met Cai E (Tsai Ao). He taught at the Academy after his graduation in July 1911. Siding with the revolutionary forces after the Chinese Revolution, he joined Brig. Cai E in the October 1911 expeditionary force that marched on Qing forces in Sichuan. He served as a regimental commander in the campaign to unseat Yuan Shikai in 1915–16. When Cai became governor of Sichuan after Yuan's death in June 1916, Zhu was made a brigade commander.

Following the death of his mentor Cai E and of his first wife Xiao Jufang in 1916, Zhu developed a severe opium habit that afflicted him for several years until 1922, when he underwent treatment in Shanghai. His troops continued to support him, and so he consolidated his forces to become a warlord. In 1920, after his troops were driven from Sichuan toward the Tibetan border, he returned to Yunnan as a public security commissioner of the provincial government. Around this time he decided to leave China for study in Europe. He first traveled to Shanghai, where he broke his opium habit and, according to historians of the Kuomintang, met Dr. Sun Yat-sen. He attempted to join the Chinese Communist Party in early 1922, but was rejected for being a warlord.

Converting to Communism 
In late 1922 Zhu went to Berlin, along with his partner He Zhihua. He resided in Germany until 1925, studying at one point at Göttingen University. Here he met Zhou Enlai and was expelled from Germany for his role in a number of student protests. Around this time he joined the Chinese Communist Party; Zhou Enlai was one of his sponsors (having sponsors being a condition of probationary membership, the stage before actual membership). In July 1925, after being expelled from Germany, he traveled to the Soviet Union to study military affairs and Marxism at the Communist University of the Toilers of the East. While in Moscow He Zhihua gave birth to his only daughter, Zhu Min. Zhu returned to China in July 1926 to unsuccessfully persuade Sichuan warlord Yang Sen to support the Northern Expedition.

In 1927, following the collapse of the First United Front, Kuomintang authorities ordered Zhu to lead a force against Zhou Enlai and Liu Bocheng's Nanchang Uprising. Having helped orchestrate the uprising, Zhu and his army defected from the Kuomintang. The uprising failed to gather support, however, and Zhu was forced to flee Nanchang with his army. Under the false name of Wang Kai, Zhu managed to find shelter for his remaining forces by joining warlord Fan Shisheng.

Zhu-Mao 

Zhu's close affiliation with Mao Zedong began in 1928 when, with the help of Chen Yi and Lin Biao, Zhu defected from Fan Shisheng's protection and marched his army of 10,000 men to Jiangxi and the Jinggang Mountains. Here Mao had formed a soviet in 1927, and Zhu began building up his army into the Red Army, consolidating and expanding the Soviet areas of control. The meeting, which happened on the Longjiang Bridge on 28 April 1928, was facilitated by Mao Zetan, who was Mao's brother serving under Zhu. He carried a letter to his brother Mao Zedong where Zhu stated, "We must unite forces and carry out a well-defined military and agrarian policy." This development became a turning point, with the merged forces forming the "Fourth Red Army", with Zhu as Military Commander and Mao as Party representative.

Zhu's leadership made him a figure of immense prestige; locals even credited him with supernatural abilities. During this time Mao and Zhu became so closely associated that to the local villagers they were known collectively as "Zhu-Mao" In 1929, Zhu De and Mao Zedong were forced to flee Jinggangshan to Ruijin following military pressure from Chiang Kai-shek. Here they formed the Jiangxi Soviet, which would eventually grow to cover some 30,000 square kilometers (11,584 square miles) and include some three million people. In 1931 Zhu was appointed leader of the Red Army in Ruijin by the CCP leadership. He successfully led a conventional military force against the Kuomintang in the lead-up to the Fourth Counter Encirclement Campaign; However, he was not able to do the same during the Fifth Counter Encirclement Campaign and the CCP fled. Zhu helped form the 1934 break-out that began the Long March.

Red Army leader 
During the Long March Zhu and Zhou Enlai organized certain battles in tandem. There were few positive effects since the real power was in the hands of Bo Gu and Otto Braun. In the Zunyi Conference, Zhu supported Mao Zedong's criticisms of Bo and Braun. After the conference, Zhu cooperated with Mao and Zhou on military affairs. In July 1935 Zhu and Liu Bocheng were with the Fourth Red Army while Mao Zedong and Zhou Enlai with the First Red Army. When separation between the two divisions occurred, Zhu was forced by Zhang Guotao, the leader of Fourth Red Army, to go south. The Fourth Red Army barely survived the retreat through Sichuan Province. Arriving in Yan'an, Zhu directed the reconstruction of the Red Army under the political guidance of Mao.

During the Second Sino-Japanese War and the Chinese Civil War, he held the position of Commander-in-Chief of the Red Army and, in 1940, Zhu, alongside Peng Dehuai, devised and organized the Hundred Regiments Offensive. Initially, Mao supported this offensive. While a successful campaign, Mao later attributed it as the main provocation for the devastating Japanese Three Alls Policy later and used it to criticize Peng at the Lushan Conference.

Later life 

In 1949 Zhu was named Commander-in-Chief of the People's Liberation Army (PLA). He also served as the vice-chairman of the Communist Party (1956–1966) and vice-chairman of the People's Republic of China (1954–1959). Zhu oversaw the PLA during the Korean War within his authority as Commander-in-Chief. In 1955, he was conferred to the rank of marshal. At the Lushan Conference, he tried to protect Peng Dehuai, by giving some mild criticisms of Peng; rather than denouncing him, he merely gently reproofed his targeted comrade, who was a target of Mao Zedong. Mao wasn't satisfied with Zhu De's behavior. After the conference, Zhu was dismissed from vice chairmen of Central Military Commission, not in least part due to his loyalty for the fallen Peng.

In April 1969, during the summit of the Cultural Revolution, Zhu was dismissed from his position on the Politburo Standing Committee of the Chinese Communist Party, and the activity of the National People's Congress was halted. In October 1969, Lin Biao issued a command named "Order Number One" that evacuated important martial figures to distant areas due to the tension between China and Soviet Union, and Zhu De was taken to Guangdong. In 1973 Zhu was reinstated in the Standing Committee.

He continued to work as a statesman until his death on 6 July 1976. His passing came six months after the death of Zhou Enlai, and just two months before the death of Mao Zedong. Zhu was cremated three days later, and received a funeral days afterwards.

Personal life

Marriage 
Zhu De married four times, according to the unfinished biography written by Agnes Smedley. However, there is no evidence of his marrying the mother of his only daughter. His known relationships were with:

 Xiao Jufang ( or Hsiao Chu-fen). Xiao was a fellow student of Zhu's at Kunming Normal Institute. The pair married in 1912. Xiao died of a fever in 1916 after giving birth to Zhu's only son, Baozhu.
 Chen Yuzhen. After the death of Xiao Jufang, Zhu was advised to find a mother for his infant son. He was introduced to Chen by friends in the military. Chen had participated in revolutionary activities in 1911, as well as in 1916. Chen reportedly set the condition that she would not marry unless her future husband proposed to her in person, which Zhu did. The two married in 1916. Chen looked after the home, even building a study for Zhu and his scholarly friends to meet, which she furnished with pamphlets, books, and manifestos on the Russian October Revolution. In the spring of 1922, Zhu left his home to visit the Sichuanese warlord Yang Sen. According to Agnes Smedley's biography, Zhu considered himself separated from Chen after leaving her and felt free to marry again, though there had been no formal divorce. Chen was killed by the Kuomintang in 1935.
 He Zhihua. He met Zhu in Shanghai and followed him to Germany in late 1922.When Zhu was deported from Germany in 1925, she was already pregnant and later gave birth in a village on the outskirts of Moscow. Zhu named the daughter Sixun, but relations between him and Zhu had diminished and she rejected his choice, naming the baby Feifei. He sent her daughter to live with her sister in Chengdu shortly after the birth. She then married Huo Jiaxin in the same year. He returned to Shanghai in 1928. She reportedly betrayed wanted communists to the Kuomintang, before being blinded in a gun attack by Red Army soldiers that killed her husband. After this, she returned to Sichuan, dying of illness before 1949.
 Wu Ruolan ( or Wu Yu-lan). Wu was the daughter of an Intellectual from Jiuyantang in Hunan. Zhu met Wu after attacking Leiyang with the Peasant's and Workers Army. They married in 1928. In January 1929, Zhu and Wu were encircled by Kuomintang troops at a temple in the Jinggang Mountains. Zhu escaped, but Wu was captured. She was executed by decapitation and her head was allegedly sent to Changsha for display.
 Kang Keqing (K'ang K'e-ching or Kang Keh-chin). Zhu married Kang in 1929 when he was 43. She was a member of the Red Army and also a peasant leader. Kang was highly studious and Zhu taught her to read and write before they married. Kang outlived him. Unlike most women who joined the Long March, she did not become part of the propaganda unit marching at the rear. Kang fought by the side of her husband, distinguishing herself as a combat soldier, a markswoman, and a troop leader.

Children 
 Zhu Baozhu was born in 1916 and later changed his name to Zhu Qi. He died in 1974 from illness.
 Zhu Min was born in Moscow in April 1926 to He Zhihua. Zhu De named her Sixun, but she rejected this and choose Feifei. He Zhihua sent her daughter to her sister in Chengdu shortly after her birth, where she went by the name He Feifei. She pursued higher education in Moscow from 1949 to 1953 before teaching at Beijing Normal University. She died of illness in 2009.

Awards 

  Chinese Soviet Republic
 Red Star Medal (1st Class) (1933)

 
  Order of Victory of Resistance against Aggression (1946)

 
  Order of August 1 (1st Class Medal) (1955)
  Order of Independence and Freedom (1st Class Medal) (1955)
  Order of Liberation (1st Class Medal) (1955)

 
  Royal Order of Cambodia (Grand Cross Medal) (1964)

 
  Star of the Republic of Indonesia (2nd Class Medal) (1961)

Works

See also 

 Chinese Red Army
 Eighth Route Army
 History of the People's Republic of China (1949–1976)
 List of generals of the People's Republic of China
 People's Liberation Army

References

Citations

Sources 

 English sources
 Pozhilov, I. "Zhu De: The Early Days of a Commander". Far Eastern Affairs (1987), Issue 1, pp. 91–99. Covers Zhu from 1905 to 1925.
 
 
 Agnes Smedley, The Great Road: The Life and Times of Chu Teh (Monthly Review Press, New York and London, 1956)
 Nym Wales (Helen Foster Snow), Inside Red China (New York: Doubleday, Doran & Company, Inc., 1939)
 William W. Whitson, The Chinese High Command: A History of Communist Military Politics, 1927–71 (New York: Praeger Publishers, 1973)

 Chinese sources
 Liu Xuemin, Hong jun zhi fu: Zhu De zhuan (Father of the Red Army: Biography of Zhu De) (Beijing: Jiefangjun Chubanshe, 2000)
 Zhonggong zhongyang wenxian yanjiu shibian, Zhu De Zhuan (Biography of Zhu De) (Beijing: Zhongyang wenxian chubanshe, 2000)
 Liu Xuemin, Wang Fa’an, and Xiao Sike, Zhu De Yuanshi (Marshal Zhu De) (Beijing: Jiefangjun wenshu chubanshe, 2006)
 Zhu De guju jinianguan, Renmin de guangrong Zhu De (Glory of the People: Zhu De) (Chengdu: Sichuan renmin chubanshe, 2006).

External links 
 People's Daily Biography
 

 
1886 births
1976 deaths
20th-century Chinese politicians
Beiyang Army personnel
Burials at Babaoshan Revolutionary Cemetery
Chairmen of the Standing Committee of the National People's Congress
Chinese Communist Party politicians from Sichuan
Chinese military personnel of World War II
Chinese nationalists
Chinese politicians of Hakka descent
Hakka generals
1
Members of the 10th Politburo Standing Committee of the Chinese Communist Party
Members of the 7th Politburo of the Chinese Communist Party
Members of the 8th Politburo Standing Committee of the Chinese Communist Party
Members of the 9th Politburo of the Chinese Communist Party
Moscow Sun Yat-sen University alumni
People from Yilong County
People of the 1911 Revolution
People of the Chinese Civil War
People's Republic of China politicians from Sichuan
Politicians from Nanchong
Republic of China warlords from Sichuan
Secretaries of the Central Commission for Discipline Inspection
Sichuan University alumni
University of Göttingen alumni
Vice presidents of the People's Republic of China